Siliwangi may refer to various people and institutions in the past and present of West Java, Indonesia:
 
 King Siliwangi (1482), eponymous ruler of Pajajaran Kingdom, a fifteenth century kingdom in West Java, centered in modern Bogor
 Siliwangi Division or KODAM VI/Siliwangi, a unit formed in West Java during the Indonesian National Revolution and named after the old kingdom
 Long March Siliwangi, the Siliwangi Division's fighting retreat from Central Java to West Java in 1949
 Kesatuan Komando Tentara Territorium III/Siliwangi (Kesko TT), early name of the Indonesian special forces unit Kopassus
 Raider Battalion Kodam Siliwangi, one of the Indonesian special forces Batalyon Raiders, formed in 2003
 Siliwangi Stadium, a multi-use stadium in Bandung